Kristian Regále is a non-alcoholic beverage company based in Paramus, New Jersey. It is most known for its Swedish American roots and sparkling apple cider.

History
The company was founded in 1988 when Nancy Bieraugel purchased the distinctive apple cider syrup from the Herrljunga CIDER company in Herrljunga, Sweden.  The beverage was being bottled in New Ulm, Minnesota by the August Schell Brewery. Nancy and her family purchased the glass, and other packaging from August Schell Brewery, and moved the production to Cold Spring, Minnesota.   She and her family began an adventure of nearly 20 years building a niche business that serviced grocery retailers across the country with this delightful non-alcoholic beverage.   Participating in Swedish events honoring "New Sweden" in 1988 began the launch, and redesigning the packaging and name with help from friends in the food business.  Her first grocery stores were the Byerly's and Lund's stores in Minneapolis.  IKEA then became the next company, and over the years Nancy built a warehouse, and broker distributor network across the United States.  In 1992, Nancy formed a partnership with Jack Berntson, former owner of Skandia Foods, the largest US importer of Scandinavian food products. She purchased the Kristian Regale company from Jack in 2004, and in 2005 sold the majority of the business to a partnership group consisting of former executives of major food companies, such as Bestfoods, Smart Balance, and Doherty Enterprises.

Around 2000, Nancy moved her beverage production to Spain so she could service IKEA worldwide. Under her guidance all the recipes are now owned by Kristian Regale.

Flavors
Kristian Regále started as a sparkling apple cider. Nancy recognized that more items were needed so she added the pear flavor also made by Herrljunga Cider.  Because lingonberries are so "Swedish" - and Nancy loved cranberry-apple - she developed her own recipe for Lingonberry-Apple.  She then developed Black Currant, and Peach flavors.

The companies tag line is:  "It's Time to Sparkle".

References

External links

Non-alcoholic drinks
Drink companies of the United States
Companies based in Bergen County, New Jersey
Food and drink companies based in New Jersey
1988 establishments in New Jersey
Paramus, New Jersey